Apatsahayesvarar Temple, Alangudi  or Guru Sthalam or Tiru Irum Poolai is a Hindu temple dedicated to Shiva located in the village of Alangudi in the Valangaiman taluk of Tiruvarur district, Tamil Nadu, India. Shiva is worshipped as Apathsahyesvarar, and is represented by the lingam. His consort Parvati is depicted as Elavarkuzhali. The presiding deity is revered in the 7th century Tamil Saiva canonical work, the Tevaram, written by Tamil saint poets known as the Nayanmars and classified as Paadal Petra Sthalam.

The temple complex covers two acres and it houses a five tier gateway tower known as gopurams, one facing the Apathsaheswarar shrine and other towards North. The temple has a number of shrines, with those of Apathsaheswarar and his consort Elavarkuzhali being the most prominent.

The temple has six daily rituals at various times from 6:00 a.m. to 8:30 p.m., and four yearly festivals on its calendar. The Brahmotsavam festival celebrated during Chittirai (April–May) is the most prominent festival.

The original complex is believed to have been built by Cholas, while the present masonry structure was built during the Nayak during the 16th century. In modern times, the temple is maintained and administered by the Hindu Religious and Charitable Endowments Department of the Government of Tamil Nadu.

Architecture
The temple has a 5-tier rajagopuram surrounded by two prakarams (closed precincts of a temple).

Legend
Legend is that Siva consumed deadly poison, giving rise to the name Alangudi and deity being termed Apatsahayesvarar, indicating saviour during hard times. The other names of the presiding deity are Aranyeswarar. There are sixteen waterbodies associated with the temple.

Pancha Aranya Sthalams: Aranyam means forest and the following five temples at different forests Thanjavur / Kumbakonam / Thiruvarur region are revered as "Pancha Aranya Sthalams".
 1. Sri Mullaivananathar Temple at Tirukkarugavur – Mullai vanam [SCN018]
 2. Sri Satchi Nathar Temple at Avalivanallur – Paadhiri vanam [SCN100]
 3. Sri Paathaaleswarar Temple at Thiru Aradaipperumpazhi (Haridwara mangalam) – Vanni vanam [SCN099]
 4. Sri Aapathsahayeswarar Temple at Thiru Erumpoolai (Alangudi) – Poolai vanam [SCN098]
 5. Sri Vilvavaneswarar Temple at Thirukoovilam Pudhur (Thirukalambur) – Vilva vanam [SCN113]

Navagraha
The temple is one of the nine Navagraha temples of Tamil Nadu and is a part of the popular Navagraha pilgrimage in the state - it houses the image of Guru (Jupiter). The planets are believed to influence the horoscope computed based on time of one's birth and subsequently influence the course of life. Each of the planets are believed to move from a star to another during a predefined period and thus sway over an individual's fortunes. The Navagrahas, as per Hindu customs, are believed to provide both good and bad effects for any individual and the bad effects are mitigated by prayers. As in other Navagraha temples, the common worship practises of the devotees include offering of cloth, grains, flowers and jewels specific to the planet deity. Lighting a set of lamps is also commonly followed in the temple. As per contemporary Saivite belief, the energies distributed cyclically by Navagrahas can be channeled based on remedial measures. As per local legends, Shiva, the overlord of the nine planetary deities, allowed them to freely grant wishes based on devotion of the devotees.

Festivals

The temple priests perform the puja (rituals) during festivals and on a daily basis. The temple rituals are performed six times a day; Kalasanthi at 6:00 a.m., Irandam Kalm at 9:00 a.m., Uchikalam at 12:00 a.m., Sayarakshai at 6:00 p.m,  Irandam Kalm at 7:30 p.m., and Arthajamam at 9:00 p.m.. Each ritual comprises four steps: abhisheka (sacred bath), alangaram (decoration), naivethanam (food offering) and deepa aradanai (waving of lamps) for Apatsahayesvarar and Elavarkuzhali. Other festivals include Vinayaka Chaturthi, Aadi Pooram, Navaratri, Aippasi Pournami, Skanda Sashti, Kartikai Deepam, Arudra Darisanam, Thaipusam, Maasi Magam, Panguni Uththiram and Vaikasi Visakam. The major festival of the temple is the Brahmotsavam celebrated during the Tamil month of Chittirai (April–June), when special worship practises are followed and the festival image of the deity is taken around the streets of Alangudi.

Religious significance

The temple is counted as one of the Navagraha Temples for planet Guru (Jupiter). Tirugnana Sambandar, a 7th-century Tamil Saivite poet, venerated Apathsaheswarar in ten verses in Tevaram, compiled as the First Tirumurai. Appar, a contemporary of Sambandar, also venerated Annamalaiyar in 10 verses in Tevaram, compiled as the Fifth Tirumurai. As the temple is revered in Tevaram, it is classified as Paadal Petra Sthalam, one of the 275 temples that find mention in the Saiva canon. The temple is one of the most visited temples in the district.

According to a Hindu legend, Mahalingaswamy at Thiruvidaimarudur is the centre of all Shiva temples in the region and the Saptha Vigraha moorthis (seven prime consorts in all Shiva temples) are located at seven cardinal points around the temple, located in various parts of the state. The seven deities are Nataraja in Chidambaram Nataraja Temple at Chidambaram, Chandikeswarar temple at Tirucheingalur, Vinayagar in Vellai Vinayagar Temple at Thiruvalanchuzhi, Muruga in Swamimalai Murugan Temple at Swamimalai, Bhairava in Sattainathar Temple at Sirkali, Navagraha in Sooriyanar Temple at Suryanar Kovil and Dakshinamoorthy in Apatsahayesvarar Temple at Alangudi, Tiruvarur.

Sources

References

External links 

 Location in Wikimapia

Shiva temples in Tiruvarur district
Padal Petra Stalam
Navagraha temples in Tamil Nadu